Andrea "Bree" Boyce, (born March 25, 1989) is an American beauty pageant titleholder from Florence, South Carolina who was named Miss South Carolina 2011.

Biography
From first to seventh grade, Boyce attended The Kings Academy in Florence, South Carolina. She later transferred to public school. She won the title of Miss South Carolina on July 2, 2011, when she received her crown from outgoing titleholder Desiree Puglia. Boyce's platform is "Eating Healthy and Fighting Obesity." Her doctor diagnosed her excessive weight as the source of her knee problems, and warned that she would have more health problems in the future unless she lost weight. Through healthy eating and exercise, Boyce lost . over a period of three years, and began competing in beauty pageants. After winning the title of Miss South Carolina, Boyce became the focus of extensive media attention, and was featured on The Today Show, Good Morning America, The View, and Inside Edition.

Boyce attended Francis Marion University and was selected for membership in Omicron Delta Kappa in 2015.

References

External links

 

1989 births
Living people
Francis Marion University alumni
American beauty pageant winners
People from Florence, South Carolina
Miss America 2012 delegates